Shakir Salman (born 1936) is an Iraqi weightlifter. He competed in the men's light heavyweight event at the 1960 Summer Olympics.

References

1936 births
Living people
Iraqi male weightlifters
Olympic weightlifters of Iraq
Weightlifters at the 1960 Summer Olympics
Sportspeople from Baghdad
20th-century Iraqi people